Péter Tamton (born 19 July 1976) is a Hungarian weightlifter. He competed in the men's heavyweight event at the 2000 Summer Olympics.

References

External links
 

1976 births
Living people
Hungarian male weightlifters
Olympic weightlifters of Hungary
Weightlifters at the 2000 Summer Olympics
People from Oroszlány
Sportspeople from Komárom-Esztergom County